Volodino is a rural locality (a village) in Andreyevskoye Rural Settlement, Alexandrovsky District, Vladimir Oblast, Russia. The population was 8 as of 2010. There are 5 streets.

Geography 
Volodino is located 10 km east of Alexandrov (the district's administrative centre) by road. Ivano-Sobolevo is the nearest rural locality.

References 

Rural localities in Alexandrovsky District, Vladimir Oblast